Oleksandr Petrovych Dovzhenko or Alexander Petrovich Dovzhenko (Oleksandr Petrovych Dovzhenko; , Aleksandr Petrovich Dovzhenko; November 25, 1956), was a Ukrainian  Soviet screenwriter, film producer and director. 
He is often cited as one of the most important early Soviet filmmakers, alongside Sergei Eisenstein, Dziga Vertov, and Vsevolod Pudovkin, as well as being a pioneer of Soviet montage theory.

Biography 
Oleksandr Dovzhenko was born in the hamlet of Viunyshche located in the Sosnitsky Uyezd of the Chernihiv Governorate of the Russian Empire (now part of Sosnytsia in Chernihiv Oblast, Ukraine), to Petro Semenovych Dovzhenko and Odarka Yermolayivna Dovzhenko. His paternal ancestors were Ukrainian Cossacks (Chumaks) who settled in Sosnytsia in the eighteenth century, coming from the neighbouring province of Poltava. Oleksander was the seventh of fourteen children born to the couple, but due to the deaths of his siblings he was the oldest child by the time he turned eleven. Ultimately, only Oleksander and his sister Polina, who later becomes a doctor, survived to adulthood.

Although his parents were uneducated, Dovzhenko's semi-literate grandfather encouraged him to study, leading him to become a teacher at the age of 19. He avoided military service during World War I because of a heart condition, but during the Civil War he served a year in the Red Army. In 1919 in Zhytomyr he was taken prisoner and sent to the prison . In 1920 Dovzhenko joined the Borotbist party. He served as an assistant to the Ambassador in Warsaw as well as Berlin. Upon his return to USSR in 1923, he began illustrating books and drawing cartoons in Kharkiv.

Dovzhenko turned to film in 1926 when he landed in Odesa. His ambitious drive led to the production of his second-ever screenplay, Vasya the Reformer (which he also co-directed). He gained greater success with Zvenyhora in 1928, the story of a young adventurer who becomes a bandit and counter-revolutionary and comes to a bad end, while his virtuous brother spends the film fighting for the revolution, which established him as a major filmmaker of his era. His following "Ukraine Trilogy" (Zvenyhora, Arsenal, and Earth), are his most well-known works in the West. Arsenal was badly received by the communist authorities in Ukraine, who began harassing Dovzhenko - but, fortunately for him, Stalin watched it and liked it.

Earth
Dovzhenko's Earth has been praised as one of the greatest silent movies ever made. The British film director Karel Reisz was asked in 2002 by the British Film Institute to rank the greatest films ever made, and he put Earth second. The film portrayed collectivization in a positive light. Its plot revolved around a landowner's attempt to ruin a successful collective farm as it took delivery of its first tractor, though it opened with a long close-up of an elderly, dying man taking intense pleasure in the taste of an apple - a scene with no obvious political message, but with some aspect of autobiography. The film was panned by the Soviet authorities. The poet, Demyan Bedny, attacked its "defeatism" over three columns of the newspaper Izvestia, and Dovzhenko was forced to re-edit it.

Appeal to Stalin 
Dovzhenko's next film, Ivan, portrayed a Dneprostroi construction worker and his reactions to industrialization, which was then summarily denounced for promoting fascism and pantheism. Fearing arrest, Dovzhenko personally appealed to Stalin. One day later, he was invited to the Kremlin, where he read the script of his next project, Aerograd, about the defence of a newly constructed city from Japanese infiltrators, to an audience of four of the most powerful men in the country - Stalin, Molotov, Kirov and Voroshilov. Stalin approved the project but 'suggested' that Dovzhenko's next project, after Aerograd, should be dramatized biography of the Ukrainian communist guerrilla fighter, Mykola Shchors.

In January 1935, the Soviet film industry celebrated its fifteenth anniversary with a major festival, during which the country's most renowned director Sergei Mikhailovich Eisenstein, who was in trouble with the authorities, and had not been allowed to complete a film for several years, gave a rambling speech that jumped from one esoteric topic to another. Dovzhenko joined in the criticism, raising a laugh pleading: "Sergei Mikhailovich, if you do not produce a film at least within a year, then please do not produce one at all... All this talk about Polynesian females, I will gladly exchange all your unfinished scenarios for one of your films." At the end of the conference, Stalin presented Dovzhenko with the Order of Lenin.

Later, Dovzhenko was summoned to the Kremlin again, and told by Stalin that he was a "free man", who was not under "any obligation" to make the film about Shchors. He took the hint, and paused work on Aerograd to follow Stalin's 'suggestion', and sent the dictator a draft of the screenplay for Schors. He was then summoned in front of the boss of the Soviet film industry Boris Shumyatsky to be told that the script contained serious political errors. His request for another meeting with Stalin was ignored, so he wrote to the dictator on 26 November 1936, pleading: "This is my life, and if I am doing it wrong, then it is due to a shortage of talent or development, not malice. I bear your refusal to see me as a great sorrow." Stalin's response was a brief note to Shumyatsky, in December, listing five things that were wrong with the script, including that "Shchors came out too crude and uncouth."

Shchors 
Dovzhenko completed Aerograd in 1935. Before its release in November, Dovzhenko had begun work on Shchors. According to Jan Leyda, who was employed in the Soviet cinema industry at the time:

Several of Dovzhenko's colleagues were shot or sent to labour camps during the Great Purge, in 1937–38, including his favourite cameraman, Danylo Demutsky, who worked with him on Earth. But when, at last, he had completed Shchors, which was released in January 1939, he was paid a huge fee - 100,000 rubles - and awarded the Stalin Prize (1941).

Later work 
During the war, Dovzhenko wrote an article and a screenplay Ukraine in Flames, which was denounced for its alleged 'veiled nationalistic moods'. There are two versions of who was behind the denunciation. Nikita Khrushchev, who was head of the Ukrainian communist party at the time, paid tribute to Dovzhenko in his memoirs as a "brilliant director", and described the denunciation of  Ukraine in Flames as a "disgraceful affair" initiated by the head of the political administration of the Red Army, Aleksandr Shcherbakov, who "was obviously trying hard to fan Stalin's anger by harping on the charge that the film scenario was extremely nationalistic." Dovzhenko had read the scenario aloud to Khrushchev, but he claimed not to have paid much attention to it because he was focused on the war. 

But a police report sent at the time by the head of the NKVD Vsevolod Merkulov to the party secretary in charge of culture, Andrei Zhdanov, said that Dovzhenko greatly resented the behaviour of Khrushchev, and leaders of the Ukrainian writers' union, who had praised the scenario on first reading, but then denounced on orders from above. Dovzhenko was quoted as saying "I don't hold anything against Stalin. I hold something against .. people who throw malicious slogans at me after all their admiration of the screenplay - these people cannot guide the war and the people. This is trash." 

After being hauled in front of the Central Committee, Dovzhenko was excluded from various official organisations, cut himself off from fellow artists, wrote novels, and applied himself to writing a screenplay about the biologist, Michurin. The film Michurin earned him another Stalin prize, in 1949, although it was revised so many times, in order to get political approval, that according to one historian, "a large part of the final version was made without him."

Khrushchev claimed that with his rise to power after the death of Stalin and the execution of the police chief Lavrentiy Beria, the persecution of Dovzhenko ended, and he was able to "live a useful active life" again. He embarked on two projects, a film adaption of the novella, Taras Bulba, by Gogol and Poem About a Sea, neither of which was completed before Dovzhenko died of a heart attack on November 25, 1956, in his dacha in Peredelkino - though the latter was completed by his widow Yulia Solntseva.

Over a 20-year career, Dovzhenko personally directed only seven films.

Legacy 
Dovchenko was a mentor to the young Soviet Ukrainian filmmakers Larisa Shepitko and Sergei Parajanov.

The Dovzhenko Film Studios in Kyiv were named after him in his honour following his death.

In 2016, after the Ukraine government had announced a programme of 'decommunisation' of place names, Karl Liebknecht Street in Melitopol, in East Ukraine, was renamed Oleksandr Dovzhenko Street. On 30 January 2023, after Melitopol had been occupied by the Russian army during the 2022 Russian invasion of Ukraine, Melitopol's Russian-installed Mayor, Galina Danilchenko announced that the street would be given back its previous name.

Filmography 
Love's Berries (translit. Yagodki lyubvi, translit. Yahidky kokhannya), 1926
Vasya the Reformer (translit. Vasya – reformator, translit. Vasya – reformator), 1926
The Diplomatic Pouch (translit. Sumka dipkuryera, translit. Sumka dypkuryera), 1927
Zvenigora (translit. Zvenigora, translit. Zvenyhora), 1928
Arsenal, 1929
Earth (translit. Zemlya, translit. Zemlya), 1930
Ivan, 1932
Aerograd (translit. Aerohrad), 1935
Bukovina: a Ukrainian Land (translit. Bukovina, Zemlya Ukrainskaya, translit., Bukovyna, Zemlya Ukrayins'ka), 1939
Shchors*, 1939
Battle for Soviet Ukraine* (translit. Bitva za nashu Sovetskuyu Ukrainu, translit. Bytva za nashu Radyans'ku Ukrayinu), 1943
Soviet Earth (translit. Strana rodnaya, translit. Krayina ridna), 1945
Victory in the Ukraine and the Expulsion of the Germans from the Boundaries of the Ukrainian Soviet Earth (translit. Pobeda na Pravoberezhnoi Ukraine i izgnaniye nemetsikh zakhvatchikov za predeli Ukrainskikh sovietskikh zemel, translit. Peremoha na Pravoberezhniy Ukrayini), 1945
Michurin, 1948 
Farewell, America (translit. Proshchay, Ameryko), 1949
Poem of the Sea* (translit. Poema o more, translit. Poema pro more), 1959

*codirected by Yuliya Solntseva

Film award 
A film award called the Oleksandr Dovzhenko State Prize was named after him for his great contributions in the film sphere.

References

Further reading 
Dovzhenko, Alexandr (ed. Marco Carynnyk) (1973). Alexandr Dovzhenko: The Poet as Filmmaker, MIT Press. 
Kepley, Jr., Vance (1986). In the Service of the State: The Cinema of Alexandr Dovzhenko, University of Wisconsin Press. 
Liber, George O. (2002). Alexander Dovzhenko: A Life in Soviet Film, British Film Institute. 
Nebesio, Bohdan. "Preface" to Special Issue: The Cinema of Alexander Dovzhenko. Journal of Ukrainian Studies. 19.1 (Summer, 1994): pp. 2–3.
Perez, Gilberto (2000) Material Ghost: Films and Their Medium, Johns Hopkins University Press. 
Abramiuk, Larissa (1998) The Ukrainian Baroque in Oleksandr Dovzhenko's Cinematic Art, The Ohio State University (UMI).

External links 

Chris Fujiwara's review Neglected Giant: Alexander Dovzhenko at the MFA
Ray Uzwyshyn Alexandr Dovzhenko's Silent Trilogy: A Visual Exploration
 John Riley "A (Ukrainian) Life in Soviet Film: Liber's Alexandr Dovzhenko", Film-Philosophy, vol. 7 no. 31, October 2003 – a review of George O. Liber (2002), Alexandr Dovzhenko: A Life in Soviet Film
 Landscapes of the Soul: The Cinema of Alexandr Dovzhenko,
 "Screenplays About the Earth" by Aleksandr Dovzhenko from SovLit.net
 Oleksandr Dovzhenko Center

1894 births
1956 deaths
People from Sosnytsia
People from Sosnitsky Uyezd
Hlukhiv National Pedagogical University of Oleksandr Dovzhenko alumni
Kyiv National Economic University alumni
Ukrainian diplomats
Soviet diplomats
Soviet propagandists
Ukrainian people of the Ukrainian–Soviet War
Borotbists
Communist Party of Ukraine (Soviet Union) politicians
20th-century Ukrainian politicians
Ukrainian avant-garde
Soviet screenwriters
Male screenwriters
Soviet film directors
Ukrainian film directors
Soviet film producers
Odesa Film Studio
Stalin Prize winners
Lenin Prize winners
Silent film directors
Burials at Novodevichy Cemetery